Events in the year 1960 in Nigeria.

Incumbents
Monarch:
 until 1 October: position not in existence
 starting 1 October: Queen Elizabeth II
Governor-General: Sir James Wilson Robertson (until 16 November), Nnamdi Azikiwe (starting 16 November)
Prime Minister: Abubakar Tafawa Balewa
 Senate President: 
 1 January: position established
 1 January – 1 October: Nnamdi Azikiwe 
 starting 1 October: Dennis Osadebay
 House Speaker: Jaja Wachukwu (until 1 October); Ibrahim Jalo Waziri (starting 1 October)
 Chief Justice: Adetokunbo Ademola

Politics
July 1960 - Adesoji Aderemi became 1st African to be appointed governor in the Commonwealth
October 1, 1960 - Nigerian Independence Day
October 1, 1960 - Tafawa Balewa became prime minister
October 1, 1960 - Sir James Robertson (1899 - 1983) became governor-general.
November 16, 1960 - Nnamdi Azikiwe
(1904–1996) became governor general

References

 
1960s in Nigeria